SynCardia Systems, LLC, headquartered in Tucson, Arizona, was founded in 2001 and is the sole manufacturer and provider of the world's only clinically proven and commercially approved Total Artificial Heart.

The SynCardia temporary Total Artificial Heart (TAH) has been in clinical use for more than 35 years.

History
In 2004, the FDA approved the SynCardia TAH (formerly known as the "CardioWest temporary Total Artificial Heart”) as a bridge to donor heart transplant in cardiac transplant-eligible candidates at risk of imminent death from end-stage biventricular failure.

SynCardia's products include the original 70cc TAH; the newer, smaller 50cc TAH, designed to fit patients of smaller stature, including more women and adolescents; the Companion 2 (C2) Hospital Driver, which provides pneumatic power to the TAH from implant through patient recovery in the hospital; and the Freedom Portable Driver, a smaller, portable pneumatic pump for the TAH that allows stable patients who meet discharge criteria to enjoy life at home while they wait for a matching donor heart.

In addition to its approval as a bridge to transplant in the U.S., Canada and Europe, the 70cc TAH is currently undergoing an FDA clinical trial in the U.S. for use as destination therapy in adult patients who are not eligible for transplant. The smaller 50cc TAH is currently approved for use in Europe and Canada and is undergoing an FDA clinical trial in the U.S. as a bridge to transplant for both pediatric and adult patients.

In September 2016, SynCardia was acquired by Versa Capital Management, LLC, a Philadelphia-based private equity investment firm which has provided financial and operational resources.

A documentary about the SynCardia TAH was released in 2016. Also in January, Don Webber was named CEO of SynCardia.

See also
 Artificial heart
 Artificial heart valve
 Wayne Griffin
 Jack G. Copeland

References

External links
 Company website

Cardiology
Implants (medicine)
Prosthetic manufacturers
Companies based in Tucson, Arizona
Medical technology companies of the United States